Signum Biosciences, Inc. is a dietary supplement company in Monmouth Junction, NJ. Signum agreed in 2019 to stop making certain claims about its EHT supplement, and to stop allowing its multi-level marketing partner firm Neora (formerly Nerium International) to make such claims.

History
Signum was founded in 2003. Gregory Stock served as the first CEO.

Neora (Nerium) partnership and FTC injunction
In 2015 Signum partnered with Neora, LLC (then known as Nerium International) to launch a dietary supplement called eicosanoyl-5-hydroxytryptamide (EHT). EHT is derived from coffee and inhibits demethylation of the enzyme protein phosphatase 2 (PPP2CA; PP2A). In October 2019 the Federal Trade Commission won a permanent injunction against Signum BioSciences, Signum Nutralogix, and affiliated companies including Neora. The injunction prohibits claims or representations of EHT's efficacy in treating or mitigating Alzheimer's disease, Parkinson's disease, or brain injury including CTE and concussion, unless those claims are backed up by randomized, double-blind, placebo-controlled human clinical testing.

References

Biotechnology companies of the United States
2003 establishments in New Jersey
Multi-level marketing products
Federal Trade Commission litigation